Daniel 'Dani' Carril Freire (born 28 July 1980) is a Spanish footballer who plays for UD Santa Mariña as a left back.

Football career
Carril was born in Vigo, Province of Pontevedra, Galicia. He was brought up at local RC Celta de Vigo's youth ranks, but never received any playing time with its main squad, signing in 2001 with amateurs Club Deportivo Grove (regional leagues) and joining fourth division club CD Lugo six years later.

After being instrumental in helping Lugo to a third level return in 2006, Carril eventually moved to division two after signing for Hércules CF. In his first and only season, he featured rarely as the team fell just three points short of a La Liga return, being mainly restricted to matches in the Copa del Rey; he scored his first league goal as a professional on 26 October 2008, in a 3–0 home win against Deportivo Alavés which also marked his debut.

In mid-July 2009, Carril joined another side in the second tier, Levante UD, agreeing to a two-year contract with the Valencians. He changed clubs again only one year later, however, signing with UD Las Palmas in the same level.

References

External links

1980 births
Living people
Spanish footballers
Footballers from Vigo
Association football defenders
Segunda División players
Segunda División B players
Tercera División players
Divisiones Regionales de Fútbol players
Celta de Vigo B players
CD Lugo players
Hércules CF players
Levante UD footballers
UD Las Palmas players
SD Ponferradina players